Jordan competed at the 2004 Summer Paralympics in Athens, Greece. The team included 10 athletes, 5 men and 5 women. Competitors from Jordan won 2 medals, including 1 silver and 1 bronze to finish 64th in the medal table.

Medallists

Sports

Athletics

Men's field

Powerlifting

Men

Women

Table tennis

Men

Women

See also
Jordan at the Paralympics
Jordan at the 2004 Summer Olympics

References 

Nations at the 2004 Summer Paralympics
2004
Summer Paralympics